Regina Y. Liu is an American statistician. She is a distinguished professor of statistics and chair of the Department of Statistics and Biostatistics at Rutgers University. Her research concerns robust statistics and nonparametric statistics, including the first formulation of simplicial depth.

Liu earned her Ph.D. in statistics from Columbia University in 1983, under the supervision of John Raphael Van Ryzin, and joined the Rutgers faculty at that time. She became a distinguished professor at Rutgers in 2001,
and department chair in 2005.

Liu became a Fellow of the American Statistical Association in 2005. She is also a fellow of the Institute of Mathematical Statistics.

Selected publications

References

External links

Year of birth missing (living people)
Living people
American statisticians
Women statisticians
Columbia Graduate School of Arts and Sciences alumni
Rutgers University faculty
Fellows of the American Statistical Association
Fellows of the Institute of Mathematical Statistics
Taiwanese statisticians